Josh Tyrell is a New Zealand-born rugby union lock who has played for  internationally.

References

1990 births
Living people
Samoa international rugby union players
Australian rugby union players
Australian sportspeople of Samoan descent
Rugby union locks